Partnerships in Care is a British provider of mental health and social care services.

In June 2013, the Care Quality Commission failed the firm’s Annesley House hospital in Nottingham against all five standards of care. Patients said some staff were “brilliant” but others had “mocked and humiliated them”. Bullying on wards was a persistent problem at the service, which provides low secure and rehabilitation wards for female patients.

In June 2014 Partnerships in Care was acquired by Acadia Healthcare in the US from Cinven (a British Private Equity company) and by June 2015 had added over 500 new beds. The company now has over 1800 beds. 

In May 2015 the company bought the mental health assets, consisting of 322 beds, from Care UK.

Elysium Healthcare took over ten of its sites in 2017.

It runs Priory Hospital East Midlands, a specialist hospital in Annesley.

References

External links
 Company website

Social care in England
Private providers of NHS services